The 2013 Protyre Formula Renault Championship was a multi-event motor racing championship for open wheel, formula racing cars held across England. The championship features a mix of professional motor racing teams and privately funded drivers competing in 2 litre Formula Renault single seat race cars that conform to the technical regulations for the championship. The 2013 season was the 19th British Formula Renault Championship organized by the British Automobile Racing Club and the second season as the premier Formula Renault 2.0 championship in the United Kingdom. The season began at Donington Park on 14 April and ended on 29 September at Silverstone Circuit. The series will form part of the BARC club racing meetings and expanded from fourteen to sixteen rounds at six events all held in England, with four triple header events.

The series has undergone rebranding after the BARC Championship became the prominent Formula Renault Championship in the United Kingdom. The series took the name Protyre Formula Renault Championship, dropping the BARC tag after its growth into one of the leading national single seater championships in Great Britain.

Teams and drivers
All teams were British-registered.

Race calendar
The series formed part of the BARC club racing meetings and expanded to sixteen rounds at six events, with four triple header events. A championship calendar was released on 14 December 2012, with the final round once again in support of the 2013 British Touring Car Championship. All rounds will held in England.

Championship standings
A driver's best 15 scores counted towards the championship, with any other points being discarded.

Protyre Formula Renault Autumn Cup
The 2013 Protyre Formula Renault Autumn Cup was the 16th British Formula Renault Winter Series and the second all BARC championship only winter series. The series was held at Rockingham Motor Speedway on 16 and 17 November. The meeting took place with a two-day format with one qualifying and two races held each day, creating a four race championship.

Teams and drivers

Race calendar and results
The calendar was announced by the championship organisers on 2 September 2013, with all rounds held at Rockingham Motor Speedway in England.

Championship standings

References

External links
 The official website of the Protyre Formula Renault Championship

Protyre Formula Renault
Protyre Formula Renault
Renault BARC